Percy Verner Noble (18 December 1902 – 19 June 1996) was a Canadian politician who served as a Progressive Conservative Member of Parliament.

Noble was born in Shallow Lake, Ontario, the first of 11 children in his family. He initially trained for his father's career as a blacksmith. After subsequent work in the farming, railway and coal industries, he would eventually settle in the mink farming business. He also raised eight children with his wife, Kathleen.

He was first elected in 1957 in the Grey North riding for the 23rd Canadian Parliament. He was re-elected in consecutive elections until the 28th Canadian Parliament which ended in 1972. The riding was realigned as Grey—Simcoe for his final term in Parliament. Following Noble's retirement from federal politics, his successor in Parliament was Gus Mitges, also of the Progressive Conservative party.

References
 (obituary)

External links
 

1902 births
1996 deaths
Members of the House of Commons of Canada from Ontario
Progressive Conservative Party of Canada MPs